Monteforte Cilento is a town and comune of the province of Salerno in the Campania region of south-west Italy.

History
Monteforte was originally a Roman castrum, which expanded in the High Middle Ages after immigration due to the Saracen incursions.

It was one of the centers of the Moti del Cilento in 1828.

Geography
Monteforte is a hill town located in northern Cilento, below Chianello mountain (1,319 m) and above the valley of Alento river. It lies on the provincial highway between Trentinara and Capizzo, a frazione of Magliano Vetere. The municipality borders with the municipalities of Cicerale, Felitto, Magliano Vetere, Orria, Perito, Roccadaspide and Trentinara.

See also
Cilentan dialect
Cilento and Vallo di Diano National Park

References

External links

Cities and towns in Campania
Localities of Cilento